Ulkottai (South) is a village in the Udayarpalayam taluk of Ariyalur district, Tamil Nadu, India.

Demographics 

As per the 2001 census, Ulkottai (South) had a total population of 1573 with 806 males and 767 females.

References 

Villages in Ariyalur district